The Storm Rider is a 1957 American Western film directed by Edward Bernds, written by Edward Bernds and Don Martin, and starring Scott Brady, Mala Powers, Bill Williams, John Goddard, William Fawcett and Roy Engel. It is based on the short story "Longrider Jones" by L. L. Foreman, from the book Rider's West. The film was released in March 1957, by 20th Century Fox.

Plot
It  was a dark & stormy night , when Bad Matt walked his 8-hand roan out into the desert night,

THE end.

Cast 
Scott Brady as Bart Jones
Mala Powers as Tay Rorick
Bill Williams as Sheriff Pete Colton
John Goddard as Harry Rorick
William Fawcett as Captain Cruickshank
Roy Engel as Major Bonnard
George Keymas as Apache Kid
Olin Howland as Will Collins 
Bud Osborne as Toby
James Dobson as Frank Cooper
Rocky Lundy as Bud Cooper
Hank Patterson as Tom Milstead
Wayne Mallory as Hanks
Court Shepard as Brass Flood 
Frank Richards as Will Feylan
Tom London as Todd (uncredited)

Producer
Scott Brady co produced the film.

References

External links 
 
The Storm Rider at BFI

1957 films
20th Century Fox films
American Western (genre) films
1957 Western (genre) films
Films based on short fiction
Films directed by Edward Bernds
1950s English-language films
1950s American films